QRC may refer to:
Qatar Red Crescent 
Quebec Railway Corporation
Quick Response Code (QR Code)
Quick Reference Card
Quick-release coupling
Queen's Royal College